Ladhana Ucha is a village in Shaheed Bhagat Singh Nagar district of Punjab State, India. The village is administrated by Sarpanch an elected representative of the village.

Demography 
As of 2011, Ladhana Ucha has a total number of 434 houses and population of 1971 of which 956 include are males while 1015 are females according to the report published by Census India in 2011. The literacy rate of Ladhana Ucha is 79.68%, higher than the state average of 75.84%. The population of children under the age of 6 years is 185 which is 9.39% of total population of Ladhana Ucha, and child sex ratio is approximately 968 as compared to Punjab state average of 846.

Most of the people are from Schedule Caste which constitutes 36.94% of total population in Ladhana Ucha. The town does not have any Schedule Tribe population so far.

As per the report published by Census India in 2011, 568 people were engaged in work activities out of the total population of Ladhana Ucha which includes 608 males and 60 females. According to census survey report 2011, 82.11% workers describe their work as main work and 17.89% workers are involved in Marginal activity providing livelihood for less than 6 months.

Education 
Amardeep Singh Shergill Memorial college Mukandpur and Sikh National College Banga are the nearest colleges.

List of schools nearby:
Govt Senior Secondary School, Ladhana Jhikka
Dashmesh Model School, Kahma
Govt High School, Jhander Kalan
Govt Gigh School, Khan Khana
Guru Ram Dass Public School, Cheta

Transport 

See also 
List of villages in India

References

External links 
 Tourism of Punjab
 Census of Punjab
 Locality Based PINCode

Villages in Shaheed Bhagat Singh Nagar district